Juan de Bolas Mountain in Saint Catherine, Jamaica  (some sources say Clarendon) is named after Juan de Bolas, A Chief of a Group of Maroons who sided with the Spanish during the British Spanish war in Jamaica 1655. He was caught by the British and turned to their side and was instrumental in defeating the Spanish. He would then betray the maroons by revealing their settlement to the British and serving as a Maroon Hunter

See also
Juan de Bolas River

References

Mountains of Jamaica
Geography of Saint Catherine Parish